Artau I ( or Artaldus,  or Artaldo) was the Count of Pallars Sobirà from 1049 until his death in or around 1081. His reign was characterised by ceaseless wars and litigations with his more powerful cousin and neighbour Raymond IV of Pallars Jussà.

Artau was the second son of William II of Pallars Sobirà and his wife Stephanie, a daughter of Ermengol I of Urgell and Tetberga, who was related to either the Counts of Provence or Forez. His father died in 1035 and was succeeded by his eldest son, Bernard II. When he died in 1049, Artau became count. Artau married twice. Before September 1050, he married Constance, whose parentage is unknown. On or before 27 January 1058, Artau took, as his second wife, Lucia (Llúcia), daughter of Bernard I of La Marche and thus a sister of Almodis, the wife of Raymond Berengar I of Barcelona. He granted control of two castles to the count of Barcelona and four to his new wife on top of her dowry. She bore him three sons: Artau II, his eldest son and heir; Ot, who became Bishop of Urgell; and William. She and Artau could also have been the parents of daughter named Maria.

In relation to his military operations both defensive and offensive directed against the county of Pallars Jussà, Artau constructed several new castles: Montcortés, Peramea, Bresca, and Baén. In 1064 Artau and Raymond of Pallars Jussà reached their first of several convenientia (agreements). Artau was forced to grant a castle to Raymond as a pledge to hold future negotiations. A second agreement of this sort was reached on 30 May 1067: Artau ceded the monastery of Santa Maria de Lavaix and quitclaimed several villages (villae) to Raymond. Around 1080 a series of convenientia were made between Raymond and either Artau I or Artau II. This time Raymond gave up the right to control (potestas) the castle of Talarn to two of his chief magnates, Pere Ramon I d'Erill and Mir Guirreta II de Bellera, while Artau granted the same of his castle of Salás to two of his men, Guillem Guitard de Vallferrera and Ramon Bernat. Both castles stood not far apart on opposite sides of the Noguera Pallaresa where it defined the border of the two counties. The final settlement and exchange of castles took place in the presence of Sancho Ramírez, King of Aragon. At the same time this Artau, whether father or son, came to an agreement with the king over a prior dispute.

Artau was a patron of the monastery of Santa Maria de Gerri. In a surviving pre-1070 charter dated to 18 June, Artau donated property to Santa Maria.
In September 1050 he and Constance made a donation; on 22 June 1059 he and Lucia; and he and Lucia again on 22 April 1068. Two further donations, of 8 July 1081 and 13 April 1082, throw into question the date of Artau's death and the succession of his son; the second donation was witnessed by another Artau, but this may be Artau III. Artau II was using the comital title as early as 1080.

Notes

References

Bibliography

  
 

1081 deaths
Counts of Pallars
People of the Reconquista
Year of birth unknown
11th-century Catalan people